Ward 1 is a ward of Bình Thạnh District, Ho Chi Minh City, Vietnam.

References

Populated places in Ho Chi Minh City